Oxyothespis villiersi is a species of praying mantis in the family Toxoderidae.

See also
List of mantis genera and species

References

villiersi
Insects described in 1950